Nystrom is a surname of Danish, Norwegian and Swedish origin.  Alternative spelling include Nyström, Nystrøm, and Nystroem. Notable people with these surnames include:

Nystrom

Anna Nystrom (1849–1913), Swedish missionary in the Caucasus, Persia, and Xinjiang, China
Bob Nystrom (born 1952), Swedish-Canadian retired professional ice hockey right-winger
Dave Nystrom, Canadian comedian and writer 
Eric Nystrom (born 1983), American ice hockey player 
John W. Nystrom, Swedish-American engineer who proposed a hexadecimal system
Karl F. Nystrom, American railroad engineer at the Milwaukee Road
Lorne Nystrom, Canadian politician
Mae Taylor Nystrom, American suffragist
Paul Nystrom, American professor of marketing at Columbia University
Stefan Nystrom, Australian criminal (supposed)

Nyström
Anders Nyström, Swedish rock musician
Ann-Christine Nyström, Finnish singer 
Bob Nyström, Swedish-born Canadian ice hockey player 
David Nyström, Swedish ice hockey player
Emilia Nyström, Finnish beach volleyball player 
Erika Nyström, Finnish beach volleyball player 
Hjalmar Nyström (1904–1960), Finnish wrestler and Olympic medalist
Jenny Nyström, Swedish painter and illustrator
Johan Olof Nyström, Swedish Olympic swimmer
Johan Nyström (swimmer), Swedish swimmer 
Johan Nyström (athlete) (1874–1968), Swedish track and field athlete 
Joakim Nyström, Swedish tennis player
Lars-Fredrik Nyström, Swedish ice hockey player 
Per Nyström, Swedish historian and politician
Rikard Nyström (1884–1943), Swedish missionary
Usko Nyström (1861–1925), Finnish architect

Nystrøm
Lene Nystrøm Rasted, Norwegian singer
Søren Nystrøm Rasted, Danish musician
Steffen Nystrøm, Norwegian football (soccer) player

Nystroem
Gösta Nystroem, Swedish composer

See also
Nyström method - Numerical analysis named after Evert Johannes Nyström.

Norwegian-language surnames
Swedish-language surnames